The 1982 Tour of the Basque Country was the 22nd edition of the Tour of the Basque Country cycle race and was held from 12 April to 16 April 1982. The race was won by José Luis Laguía of the Reynolds team.

General classification

References

1982
Bas